"Break Stuff" is a nu metal and rap metal song by American rap rock band Limp Bizkit, released on May 2, 2000, as the fourth and final single from their second studio album Significant Other (1999). The song was released alongside "N 2 Gether Now", and has remained a staple of Limp Bizkit's live shows.

Music video 
The music video was shot at Skatelab. The band members are seen in some scenes not playing any instruments and some scenes they are playing each other's instruments. Cameos include Snoop Dogg, Jonathan Davis of Korn, Dr. Dre, Eminem and his daughter Hailie, Pauly Shore, and model Lily Aldridge.

It received its world premiere in February 2000 on the short-lived USA Network music show Farmclub, alongside Korn's video for their single, "Make Me Bad". Both groups made a guest appearance to introduce their respective videos.

Live performances 
The song was noted for a performance at Woodstock '99 in which violent actions have occurred. When the song played, Fred Durst encouraged the crowd to become rowdy, stating,  "Don't let anybody get hurt. But I don't think you should mellow out. That's what Alanis Morissette had you motherfuckers do. If someone falls, pick 'em up." In the mosh pit, fans tore plywood on the walls when the song played and numerous sexual assaults were reported to have occurred.

Awards and legacy 
The video for the song won the MTV Video Music Award for The Best Rock Video in 2000.

In 2022, Louder Sound and Kerrang each named "Break Stuff" as Limp Bizkit's greatest song.

Covers 
Richard Cheese and Lounge Against the Machine covered this as a lounge version on his 2000 album, Lounge Against the Machine.
Three Days Grace has covered the song in 2011 during live shows.
Australian metal band Confession did a cover of this song.
In 2012, pop-punk band Patent Pending recorded a tongue-in-cheek piano ballad version for their EP Spring Break 99.
Baltimore pop-punk band All Time Low covered this song during their World Triptacular tour.
American singer-songwriter K.Flay has covered this song in her 2020 EP 'Don't Judge A Song By Its Cover,' along with Green Day's "Brain Stew" and The Offspring's "Self Esteem."
Russian punk bank Pussy Riot covered this song for use in an episode of the Netflix show In from the Cold.

Charts and certifications

Charts

Certifications

References

External links 

2000 singles
Limp Bizkit songs
1999 songs
Interscope Records singles
Music videos directed by Fred Durst
Songs written by Fred Durst
Songs written by Wes Borland
Songs written by John Otto (drummer)
Songs written by Sam Rivers (bassist)